Algafari is a surname. Notable people with the surname include:

Nidal Algafari (born 1965), Bulgarian television director
Yousef Algafari (born 1972), Saudi Arabian chief executive